Khet Aung (born 1946) is a Burmese politician. He has served as Chief Minister of Kachin State, the head of the Kachin State Government, since March 2016. An ethnic Kachin, he worked as a dentist before entering politics.

Political career 
Khet Aung was not a member of any political party prior to the 2015 Myanmar general election, but became an NLD member in 2015. He ran for Kachin State Hluttaw in the November 2015 election, winning a seat in Myitkyina.

In the wake of the 2021 Myanmar coup d'état on 1 February, Khet Aung was detained by the Myanmar Armed Forces.

Personal life 
Salai is an ethnic Kachin and practicing Baptist. He has two sons and two daughters. Khet Aung's brother, Khet Htein Nan, is a well-known Kachin politician and former upper house MP. Khet Htein Nan is a member of the rival Union Solidarity and Development Party and lost in the 2015 election.

References 

1946 births
Living people
National League for Democracy politicians
Government ministers of Myanmar
People from Myitkyina
Burmese Baptists
Burmese people of Kachin descent